Roques is a commune in the Haute-Garonne department in southwestern France. The IKEA Store in Haute-Garonne was located in this Commune.

Population
The inhabitants of the commune are known as Roquois and Roquoises in French.

See also
Communes of the Haute-Garonne department

References

Communes of Haute-Garonne